The Soundgraphy is the 11th album by Casiopea, recorded and released in 1984 in Japan. This is also Casiopea's first Compilation album.

Track listing

Personnel
CASIOPEA are
Issei Noro - Electric guitar
Minoru Mukaiya - Keyboards
Tetsuo Sakurai - Electric Bass
Akira Jimbo - Drums

GUEST MUSICIANS
Harvey Mason - Drums (B1), Percussion (A3, B1)
Paulinho Da Costa - Percussion (A3)
Bob James - Keyboards (A3)
Lee Ritenour - Guitar (B1)
Don Grusin - Keyboards (B1)
Nathan East - Bass (B1)
Kiki Dee - Vocal (B4)

Production
Producer - Synsuke Miyazumi, Harvey Mason, Richard Manwaring, Issei Noro
Engineer - Norio Yoshizawa, Peter Chaikin, Richard Manwaring
Art Director - Kaoru Watanabe
Cover Illustration - Mizumaru Anzai
Cover Designers - Kaoru Watanabe, Hiroyasu Yoshioka, Katsunori Hironaka
Remastering engineer - Kouji Suzuki (2016)

Release history

External links

References

1984 compilation albums
Casiopea albums
Alfa Records albums